Derbyshire County Cricket Club in 1904 was the cricket season when the English club  Derbyshire had been playing for thirty three years. It was their tenth season in the County Championship and  they won five matches to finish tenth in the Championship table.

1904 season

In addition to eighteen games in the County Championship, Derbyshire played one game against MCC, one against the touring South Africans and two against Grace's London County side. They won seven matches overall. Dr Maynard Ashcroft was in his only season as captain. Charles Ollivierre was top scorer and Arnold Warren took most wickets.

The season saw one of Derbyshire's most accomplished performances - the defeat of Essex by nine wickets at Chesterfield.  Essex made 597 in their first innings, P. A. Perrin scoring 343 not out, and looked to be in a commanding position. However Derbyshire replied with 548, Olliviere making 229, and dismissed Essex for 97 in the second innings. Derbyshire lost only one wicket in their second innings for 149, with Olliviere 92 not out and won by nine wickets.

George Stevenson was the only new player in the season and played his only two matches for the club in the year.

Matches

{| class="wikitable" width="100%"
! bgcolor="#efefef" colspan=6 | List of  matches
|- bgcolor="#efefef"
!No.
!Date
!V
!Result 
!Margin
!Notes
|- 
|1
 |16 May 1904 
|  Surrey Kennington Oval 
|bgcolor="#00FF00"|Won
| 122 runs
| Lockwood 7-79; W Bestwick 8-103; Hayes 6-48 
|- 
|2
|19 May 1904 
|London County Cricket Club   Crystal Palace Park 
|bgcolor="#FF0000"|Lost
| Innings and 31 runs
| LG Wright 139; Hathorn 117; Braund 6-40 
|- 
|3
| 23 May 1904 
| Hampshire  County Ground, Southampton 
 |bgcolor="#FFCC00"|Drawn
|
| Hill 111; W Bestwick 5-133 
|- 
|4
|26 May 1904 
| Yorkshire  County Ground, Derby 
 |bgcolor="#FFCC00"|Drawn
|
|  
|- 
|5
|06 Jun 1904 
|  Sussex     County Ground, Hove 
|bgcolor="#FF0000"|Lost
| Innings and 65 runs
| C. B. Fry 226; EM Ashcroft 111; Relf 5-81 
|- 
|6
|09 Jun 1904 
| MCC     Lord's Cricket Ground, St John's Wood 
|bgcolor="#00FF00"|Won
| 8 wickets
| W Storer 110; Thompson 7-101; W Bestwick 5-31; A Warren 5-23 
|- 
|7
|13 Jun 1904 
| Leicestershire  County Ground, Derby 
|bgcolor="#FF0000"|Lost
| 6 wickets
| Allsopp 5–54 
|- 
|8
|16 Jun 1904 
| Essex   County Ground, Leyton 
|bgcolor="#00FF00"|Won
|39 runs
| Gillingham 103; SWA Cadman 126; A Warren 5-71 and 6-66 
|- 
|9
|20 Jun 1904 
| Warwickshire North Road Ground, Glossop 
|bgcolor="#00FF00"|Won
| Innings and 24 runs
| A Warren 6-66 
|- 
|10
|27 Jun 1904 
| Nottinghamshire     Queen's Park, Chesterfield 
|bgcolor="#FF0000"|Lost
| 330 runs
| James Iremonger 142; Jones 119; W Storer 5-34; Wass 5-103; A Warren 5-56; Gunn 6-19 
|- 
|11
|30 Jun 1904 
|  Surrey  County Ground, Derby 
|bgcolor="#FF0000"|Lost
|Innings and 103 runs
| G Curgenven  124; Hayes 273; Lees 8-66 
|- 
|12
|04 Jul 1904 
| Yorkshire  Bramall Lane, Sheffield 
|bgcolor="#FF0000"|Lost
| 4 wickets
| Haigh 104 and 5-85 
|- 
|13
|07 Jul 1904 
| Leicestershire  Aylestone Road, Leicester 
|bgcolor="#00FF00"|Won
| 306 runs
| LG Wright 140; EM Ashcroft 100; W Bestwick 7-42 
|- 
|14
|14 Jul 1904 
| Lancashire   County Ground, Derby 
|bgcolor="#FF0000"|Lost
| Innings and 129 runs
| James Hallows 111;  Brearley 6-33
|- 
|15
|18 Jul 1904 
| Essex   Queen's Park, Chesterfield 
|bgcolor="#00FF00"|Won
| 9 wickets
| Perrin 343; CA Ollivierre 229; Bill Reeves 5-192 
|- 
|16
|25 Jul 1904 
|  Sussex    County Ground, Derby 
 |bgcolor="#FFCC00"|Drawn
|
| Vine 169 
|- 
|17
|28 Jul 1904 
 | Nottinghamshire  Welbeck Abbey Cricket Ground 
 |bgcolor="#FFCC00"|Drawn
|
| A Warren 8-69 and 7-43; Wass 6-71 
|- 
|18
|01 Aug 1904 
| Hampshire   County Ground, Derby 
|bgcolor="#FF0000"|Lost
| 9 wickets
| Hesketh-Pritchard 6-68; Baldwin 5-53 
|- 
|19
|04 Aug 1904 
| Warwickshire Edgbaston, Birmingham 
 |bgcolor="#FFCC00"|Drawn
|
| LG Wright 131; A Warren 5-47; Santall 5-46
|- 
|20
|08 Aug 1904 
 |London County Cricket Club    Queen's Park, Chesterfield  
|bgcolor="#00FF00"|Won
| 139 runs
| W. G. Grace 6-78; EM Ashcroft 5-18; Coe 5-46 
|- 
|21
|15 Aug 1904 
 | South Africans    County Ground, Derby 
 |bgcolor="#FFCC00"|Drawn
|
| A Warren 5-60 
|- 
|22
|25 Aug 1904 
| Lancashire   Old Trafford, Manchester 
|bgcolor="#FF0000"|Lost
|131 runs
| Johnny Tyldesley 104; A Warren 6-62 
|- 
|

Statistics

County Championship batting averages

County Championship bowling averages

Wicket Keeper
Joe Humphries  Catches 34,  Stumping  2

See also
Derbyshire County Cricket Club seasons
1904 English cricket season

References

1904 in English cricket
Derbyshire County Cricket Club seasons
English cricket seasons in the 20th century